Hi-Tech City railway station in Hyderabad, Telangana, India located on the Wadi–Hyderabad Deccan section of South Central Railway. Jawaharlal Nehru Technological University, Hyderabad and localities like Kukatpally, Madhapur and are accessible from this station.

A modern railway terminal is proposed to be constructed near HITEC City railway station to facilitate passengers in the western parts of the city. There are also proposals to build a fourth railway terminal to handle the excess inter-city railway transportation in the city due to an increase in rail traffic.

Meanwhile, in order to ease the boarding long distant trains by the surrounding public, the railways had decided to provide halt for long distant running trains here. In that regard an Infra structure upliftment was carried over by SCR. As of August, 2021, the existing 2 platforms were extended to handle the 24 coaches trains at a cost of close to 2 Crore Rupee , Parking areas on both sides were improvised and 2 lifts were installed at a cost of 70 Lakh Rupee

Transport 
TSRTC Miyapur Depot operates a Bus service to VBIT (  Vanenburg IT park) Via Cyber towers ( Hitech City junction ) and Mindspace IT park for Rs.5 from station to VBIT. There are also shared Autos which ply to VBIT, Infotech, Madhapur and other IT parks. Autos charge Rs15 from station to VBIT . 

Moreover TSRTC Miyapur -1,2 and Kukatpally Bus Depots are operating buses to Mehidhipatnam and a few buses rarely to Secunderabad from KPHB 4th phase wherein, this Hitech-City Railway Station is closely located. 

19M - KPHB 4th phase to Mehidhipatnam

10K - KPHB 4th phase ( extended from Temple bus stop/ 3rd phase) to Secunderabad via Ameerpet, Begumpet

Lines
Hyderabad Multi-Modal Transport System
Falaknuma– Lingampally route (FL Line)
 Hyderabad-Lingampally route

References

External links
MMTS Timings as per South Central Railway
MMTS Train Timings

MMTS stations in Hyderabad